R.L. Kelly/RL (born Rachel Levy), is an American electropop musician from Los Angeles, California.

Career
Levy began her career in February 2013, releasing her first EP titled Life's A Bummer. In September 2013, Levy released a 7" split with Alex G via Birdtapes. In late 2014, she released a split with musician Spencer Radcliffe, titled Brown Horse. Levy additionally released a standalone digital single later that year titled "Alright". In March of 2019, Levy released Blink 183, a two-song EP on Bandcamp, as well as The Back Catalogue, Vol. 421, a cassette tape which compiles RL tracks from over the years.  In September 2022, Levy changed from the "unfortunate jokey name" R.L. Kelly to simply RL. In September of that year, she released the EP Be True via Lauren Tapes, which includes a new version of her song "Feels Real" as well as three new tracks.

Discography
EPs
Life's A Bummer (2013, Orchid Tapes)
Blink 183 (2019)
Be True (2022, Lauren Records)
Splits
R.L. Kelly/Alex G. (2013, Birdtapes)
R.L. Kelly/Spencer Radcliffe - Brown Horse (2014, Orchid Tapes)
Albums

 Friends (2013)

References

American synth-pop musicians
Living people
Year of birth missing (living people)